Herbert Edward McGee  (11 August 1917 – May 1995) was a chairman of Sheffield Wednesday Football Club.

In April 1984, as Chairman of Sheffield Wednesday, he advised Sheffield Wednesday fans not to travel to Ninian Park for a game against Cardiff City F.C. because he felt Cardiff were attempting to cash in by charging higher ticket prices against promotion candidates Wednesday. Cardiff were charging £2.50 to Cardiff fans and those who bought tickets in advance but £3 to Wednesday fans.

He was the chairman of the club at the time of the Hillsborough disaster.

He resigned from his position as Chairman soon after and was replaced by Dave Richards.

He was appointed an OBE in 1991 for services to Sheffield.

References 

1917 births
1995 deaths
Sheffield Wednesday F.C. directors and chairmen
Officers of the Order of the British Empire